HKCH may refer to the following hospitals in Hong Kong:

Hong Kong Central Hospital, a defunct private hospital in Central
Hong Kong Children's Hospital, a government hospital in Kai Tak